Yuki Hashimoto or Yūki Hashimoto may refer to:

, Japanese baseball player
, Japanese footballer
, Japanese judoka